The Football League play-offs for the 2002–03 season were held in May 2003, with the finals taking place at Millennium Stadium in Cardiff. The play-off semi-finals will be played over two legs and will be contested by the teams who finish in 3rd, 4th, 5th and 6th place in the Football League First Division and Football League Second Division and the 4th, 5th, 6th and 7th placed teams in the Football League Third Division table. The winners of the semi-finals will go through to the finals, with the winner of the matches gaining promotion for the following season.

Background
The Football League play-offs have been held every year since 1987. They take place for each division following the conclusion of the regular season and are contested by the four clubs finishing below the automatic promotion places.

In the First Division, Sheffield United, who are aiming to return to the top flight for the first time since 1994, finished 12 points behind second placed Leicester City, who in turn finished 6 points behind champions Portsmouth, who returned to the top flight for the first time since 1988. Reading who are aiming for a place in the top flight for the first time in their history, finished in fourth place in the table. Wolverhampton Wanderers, who are aiming to return to the top flight after nearly 20 years outside the top flight, finished in fifth place. Nottingham Forest finished 2 points behind Wolverhampton Wanderers and were looking for a place back in the Premiership for the first time since 1999.

First Division

Semi-finals
First leg

Second leg

Wolverhampton Wanderers won 3–1 on aggregate.

Sheffield United won 5–4 on aggregate.

Final

Second Division

Semi-finals
First leg

Second leg

Cardiff City won 1–0 on aggregate.

Queens Park Rangers won 2–1 on aggregate.

Final

Third Division

Semi-finals
First leg

Second leg

Bournemouth won 3–1 on aggregate.

Lincoln City won 6–3 on aggregate.

Final

External links
Football League website

 
English Football League play-offs
play-offs
May 2003 sports events in the United Kingdom